KETK may refer to:

 KETK-TV, a television station (channel 56) licensed to Jacksonville, Texas, United States
 KETK-LP, a low-power television station (channel 53) licensed to Lufkin, Texas, United States